7669 was an American R&B girl group, who were signed to Motown Records in the 1990s. The name 7669 was a fusion of US independence(1776) & the sexual revolution(1969). The group was composed of members Angela "Big Ange" Hunte, Marcy "Shorti 1 Forti" Roberts, El-Melek A. "El Boog-E" Moore and Mallore "Thicknezz" Irvine.

Their debut album, 7669 East from a Bad Block, was released on November 2, 1993, and scored two minor hits on the US Billboard R&B chart with "So High" (#35), and "Joy" (#72). "Joy" peaked at #60 in the UK Singles Chart in June 1994.

The band appeared on a 1993 episode of Soul Train. In later years, group member Angela Hunte became an in-demand songwriter and background vocalist, working on hit songs released by Jay-Z, Danity Kane and Britney Spears, among others.

Discography

Albums

Singles

References

External links
[] Album and singles info, chart info and music video links.

American girl groups
American contemporary R&B musical groups